The TUMO Center for Creative Technologies is a free education program for teenagers aged 12–18 specializing in technology and design, with education being provided at various TUMO centers and hubs.

The first TUMO center opened in Yerevan, Armenia in 2011. There are currently four TUMO centers in Armenia and Artsakh. These are located in Yerevan, Dilijan, Gyumri, and Stepanakert with 6 TUMO boxes operating in neighboring towns. Eight additional centers exist outside of Armenia in Paris, Beirut, Moscow, Tirana, Berlin, Lyon, Zürich, and Kyiv. Plans for new centers and TUMO Boxes both in Armenia and abroad (California, Tokyo, and Astana) are currently under development.

In 2017, TUMO Studios, a non-profit outfit that provides a creative space for several different types of artistic design, from pottery, jewelry-making, and fashion to cooking and embroidery, was launched. TUMO Studios is geared towards young professionals from the ages of 16–28.

On February 19, 2018, at the World Congress on Information Technology conference in Hyderabad, India, TUMO received the "Implementation of the Digital Century" award.

In 2019, TUMO announced plans for TUMO Box, a mobile, technically equipped mini-center. Boxes can be installed in any city or village and serve as self-study areas for local youth. TUMO Boxes are open in Gavar, Berd, Vayk, Sevan, Kapan, and Martakert. Plans are in the works for TUMO Box programs in other towns and villages.

2019 also saw the launch of the EU TUMO Convergence Center for Engineering and Applied Sciences. The center will be located adjacent to TUMO's Yerevan campus on a 25,000 square meter space, serving as a hub for research, education, and startups. The center will also house a branch of the French University in Armenia and School 42, a prominent French-based programming school geared towards young professionals.

TUMO received the 2019 Europe Nostra Award in Education, Training and Outreach. The award is routinely given to organizations and individuals who make significant contributions in the areas of conservation, research and dedicated service.

Background

The TUMO Center for Creative Technologies was founded in Yerevan, Armenia in 2011, with the first center opening on August 14. Serj Tankian of System of a Down performed a solo concert at the center's opening ceremony.

TUMO is a non-profit venture founded by Sam and Sylva Simonian, with funding fully provided through the pair's Simonian Educational Foundation. Sam Simonian is an Armenian-American engineer who reached great success in the 1990s with INET, a telecommunications company. 
 
TUMO's CEO Marie Lou Papazian developed TUMO's educational program and led efforts to design and construct the center's first facility in Yerevan. Prior to running TUMO, Papazian headed the Education for Development Foundation, which brought together students from Armenia and the Diaspora through online education programs. Papazian holds a master's degree is computing technology from Columbia University's Teachers College along with an additional degree in engineering and construction management (with Papazian assisting in the construction of several renowned high rise buildings in New York).

Board of Advisors

 Michael Aram (Founder, Michael Aram)
 Rev Lebaredian (Vice President, Nvidia)
 Raffi Krikorian (Emerson Collective, Uber, Twitter)
 Roger Kupelian (VFX Artist, Fugitive Studios)

 Pegor Papazian (CEO, Bazillion Beings)
 Katherine Sarafian (Producer, Pixar)
 Alex Seropian (CEO, Industrial Toys)
 Serj Tankian (Musician, System of a Down)

Learning System

TUMO offers extracurricular, innovative education programs in design and technology, providing teenagers with the space and equipment to advance their education while developing technical skills. One unique aspect of TUMO's education model concerns the TUMO Path, a software program developed in-house that places beginning students on a learning plan based on the students' expressed areas of interest, showing the students' rate of progress and letting them know which tasks they need to complete to move on to the next level. TUMO's curriculum consists of self-learning exercises, workshops and learning labs in 14 learning targets, including:

 Animation
 Game Development
 Filmmaking
 Web Development
 Music
 Writing
 Drawing
 Graphic Design
 3D Modeling
 Programming
 Robotics
 Motion Graphics
 Photography
 New Media

Self-Learning 
Self-learning activities are short, interactive exercises designed to inspire and develop skills. TUMO coaches help with activities by getting learners unstuck and providing advice and encouragement. Students have hundreds of different activities to choose from, most of which are prerequisites for future workshops in each learning target.

Workshops 
Workshops are led by specialists across TUMO's 14 learning targets. They range in difficulty from beginning to advanced and culminate in individual or team projects. Each project is published to the participant's portfolio and is sometimes submitted to competitions and festivals, or published online and in app stores.

Project Labs 
Project labs are offered on an ad hoc basis by top technology and design professionals from all over the world. Over 100 experts come to TUMO every year to lead advanced labs and work with TUMO students on real-world projects. Labs can last anywhere from a couple of weeks to several months.

Portfolio 
There are no diplomas or certificate of completion at TUMO. Instead, student work and projects become a part of their online portfolio, which can be used when applying for a university or a job. Selections of student work can be accessed at https://tumo.org/portfolio/.

Branches

TUMO Yerevan 
TUMO's first center opened in Yerevan in 2011. The center's namesake is inspired by next-door Tumanyan Park, which bears the name of prominent Armenian author Hovhannes Tumanyan. TUMO Yerevan was designed by architect Bernard Khoury, with the center's design reflecting TUMO's pedagogical approach towards flexibility, transparency, and technological creativity. Approximately 15,000 students actively attend the center.

TUMO Dilijan 
TUMO's second center in Dilijan opened in 2012 under a cooperative agreement between TUMO and the Armenian General Benevolent Union, with additional support from the Central Bank of Armenia. TUMO Dilijan provides supplemental education to hundreds of young students, some of whom travel from remote villages to attend the center. Currently, the center is expanding in order to provide TUMO's educational program to even more teenagers from surrounding villages.

TUMO Gyumri 
TUMO Gyumri has been operating in a temporary location since 2015. The center's 2,000 students will soon move to the Gyumri Historical Theater Building, which TUMO has been restoring in order to accommodate a planned 4,000 students. The idea of TUMO Gyumri sprang from Shant TV, which kickstarted a fundraising drive to open the center. TUMO Gyumri is one of three TUMO centers (along with TUMO Dilijan and TUMO Stepanakert) to benefit from a cooperative partnership with the Armenian General Benevolent Union.

TUMO Stepanakert 
TUMO Stepanakert is one of three areas of cooperation between TUMO and AGBU. It is located on the first floor of a historic building in the city, donated to TUMO on behalf of the Republic of Artsakh and renovated with the help of Karabakh Telecom. More than 1,000 students from Stepanakert and surrounding areas currently attend the center. Because of high demand, the center will soon expand to the second floor of the same building.

TUMO Paris 

The first TUMO International Center opened in Paris in October 2018. It is located in the center of Forum des Images in Les Halles. The center provides free supplemental education to about 1,500 12–18 year olds.

TUMO Beirut 
TUMO Beirut is the second TUMO center operating outside of Armenia and the first in the Middle East. It is located in the Beirut Digital District. The center unofficially opened in 2018 and will shortly open to Lebanese youth eager to pursue their creativity within TUMO's educational disciplines.

TUMO Moscow 
TUMO Moscow opened in Moscow on August 26, 2020, by Mayor Sergey Sobyanin. It is located in Krasnaya Presnya. Up to 2,000 teenagers a month will be able to study here. 100 of the most talented teenagers will get the opportunity to study for free.

TUMO Tirana
TUMO Tirana is the fourth addition to the TUMO family and it opened its doors in October 2020. It is temporarily located in the Arena Business Center located in Albania’s biggest stadium. After its reconstruction, the center will relocate to the Pyramid of Tirana. The Soviet-era landmark will be revamped by MVRDV, a renowned Dutch architectural studio. TUMO Tirana was opened in cooperation with the American-Albanian Development Foundation and the Municipality of Tirana. TUMO Tirana is the first TUMO center in the Balkans.

TUMO Berlin
TUMO Berlin opened in Berlin in November 2020 and occupies four floors in a brand new building, located in the historic Charlottenburg district. Over 1,000 students will have the opportunity to study at the fifth international TUMO Center, that offers cutting-edge program around 10 learning targets. The official opening of TUMO Berlin is scheduled for 2021.

TUMO Koghb
A new TUMO center in Armenia's north-eastern border village of Koghb opened its doors in 2021 thanks to a partnership with the local Koghb Foundation. The center will accommodate as many as 1,000 teenagers from Koghb and neighboring towns of Noyemberyan, Berdavan and beyond. The building, designed by architect Bernard Khoury, is equipped with high-tech workshop rooms, self-learning stations, a sound recording studio, a cinema, and a large sports facility.

TUMO Masis
The town of Masis, to the south of Yerevan, is the latest addition to the TUMO family. Thanks to a partnership with the Masis Development Foundation the center will accommodate up to 1,000 students, with room for expansion. A unique aspect of TUMO Masis is its francophone orientation: it will add French to TUMO's languages of instruction and will establish exchanges with instructors from France and other French-speaking countries. (Note: It hasn't been announced when it will open)

TUMO Lyon, Auvergne-Rhône-Alpes
A new TUMO in France: TUMO Lyon, Auvergne-Rhône-Alpes is the second Center in France. It opened in January 2022 on the Campus Région du Numérique à Charbonnières. The center allows free education in 8 areas: programming, animation, video games, graphic design, cinema, robotics, music and 3D modelling for 12-18 year olds.

TUMO Kyiv 
Located in the 18th century Arsenal Factory, recently turned into a technology hub, TUMO Kyiv will enable Ukrainian teens to master skills at the intersection of tech and design, including computer programming, animation, robotics, graphic design and more.

TUMO Los Angeles 
In June 2021, Adrin Nazarian announced $9 million in state funding to establish a TUMO location in the southeast San Fernando Valley.

Serj Tankian, a member of TUMO's Advisory Board, has stated that the Los Angeles center will be located in North Hollywood. He has emphasized "the fact that it's in L.A., we can get actors, we can get filmmakers. I think the creative side, especially the entertainment creative side of the TUMO L.A, is gonna have a VIP list. I'm gonna get hassled to hassle people basically, for the next couple of years.

TUMO Box 
The TUMO Box project was announced in 2019. TUMO Boxes will function as satellite TUMO centers wirelessly connected to larger TUMO centers. This project will allow rural Armenian youth outside of close proximity to a TUMO branch to access TUMO's educational program. The TUMO Box is mobile and can easily be installed in any city or village, functioning as a self-learning center for local youth. Upon completing self-learning activities at their local TUMO Box, students will travel to the nearest TUMO branch for specialized workshops and project labs.

The project has already opened its doors in Berd and in Gavar as part of a collaboration among TUMO, Amundi-ACBA, and the HAYG Foundation. Upon completing self-learning activities in the TUMO Box's, students can then travel to TUMO Dilijan for more hands-on, practical training. TUMO Boxes will initially provide education in technology and design to about 250 students a year.

On December 20, 2021, a TUMO Box was opened in Vayk alongside two other boxes in Kapan and Sevan on the same day. This box is supported by Dr. Armineh and Dr. Ara Tavitian.

The box in Sevan was opened on December 20, 2021, with the support of an anonymous donor.

The box in Kapan is supported by Lara Arslanian, Garabed Bardakjian and Sarine Semerjian. The box will remain in place for one year, after which it will be replaced by the full-featured TUMO Kapan center inside the city's historic train station, currently being renovated thanks to a generous donation by Judy Saryan and Victor Zarougian.

The TUMO box in Martakert, the first in Artsakh, marked the launch of TUMO's Artsakh expansion program. TUMO Stepanakert has welcomed approximately 4000 students and held over 300 workshops, 100 learning labs, and countless special projects with the support of AGBU since 2015. Students from Martakert participate in the self-learning portion of the program at the box, and commute to TUMO Stepanakert for workshops and learning labs, using a specially organized transportation system.

EU TUMO Convergence Center 
The EU TUMO Convergence Center for Engineering and Applied Sciences launched in 2019. The center is currently being implemented as part of a partnership with the European Union and the French University in Armenia. It will be located adjacent to TUMO Yerevan and will cover approximately 25,000 square meters. The center, which cost roughly 25 million euros, will function as a hub for education, research, and startup industries. The center aspires to create an open platform while building a vibrant community, bringing together students, young professionals, and both local and international companies. Additional wings of the facility will provide space for a branch of the French University in Armenia and School 42, a well-known computer programming school geared towards young professionals initially established in France. The center is currently being designed by MVRDV, a Dutch architecture firm. Plans for the center should be finalized by spring 2020.

TUMO Studios
TUMO Studios is a nonprofit educational program for university students and young professionals. The studio provides a space for individuals to create innovative analog products that reflect Armenian culture and materials while competing in the global market.

TUMO Studios offers technical development and design training in ten distinct areas: jewelry, ceramics, embroidery, printing, fashion, accessories design, wood carving, stone masonry, production design, and cooking.

The studios are located on 38 Pushkin Street in an early 20th-century building that used to house industrialist Arakel Afrikyan. The studios have preserved the building's interior, with the interior's wall design and furniture dating back to turn of the century Yerevan.

The John and Hasmik Mgrdichian Foundation (JHM) has been a sponsor of TUMO Studios since its inception in 2017. It has worked closely with the TUMO Studios team to build a strong foundation in contemporary Armenian design.

TUMO Labs 
TUMO Labs represents the educational direction of the EU TUMO Convergence Center. This tuition-free applied science and engineering hub connects higher education with industry. Anyone over the age of 18 can participate in the program designed specifically for TUMO Labs.

The TUMO Labs education program is based on the just-in-time methodology so that the TUMO projects and guided self-learning content corresponds to the constantly evolving tech and science industries.

TUMO Labs also includes 42 Yerevan, the Armenian branch of the 42 network of programming schools. 42's curriculum is based on a self-learning platform where students complete practical projects and refine their skills.

Camp TUMO 
TUMO's annual summer camp has been taking place since 2012. The camp allows teenagers from all over the world to familiarize themselves with TUMO's curriculum while accelerating their knowledge and skill levels in several educational disciplines. Additionally, attendants participate in games and various events while gaining the opportunity to tour Armenia's many historical-cultural sites.

Camp TUMO is the center's only source of funds. All proceeds from the camp are directed towards the development of education in Armenia and the provision of tuition-free access to TUMO centers for more than 10,000 permanent students in Armenia and Artsakh: www.camptumo.com

Awards 
TUMO received the 2019 Europa Nostra Award in Education, Training, and Outreach. The award is given to organizations and individuals who make significant contributions in the areas of conservation, research, and dedicated service.

On February 19, 2018, TUMO was presented the "Implementation of the Digital Century" award at the World Congress on Information Technology (WCIT) Forum in Hyderabad, India.

TUMO CEO Marie Lou Papazian was awarded the Order of Academic Palms in Paris on May 15, 2019. The award was given to Papazian by Anne HIdalgo, the mayor of Paris. The Order of Academic Palms recognizes significant contributions to science and education.

Tales of NETO, a collaboration between TUMO and the European Union, won a 2017 N.I.C.E. award in Germany for innovation. Tales of NETO is a popular mobile game aimed at educating users on the dangers of corruption.

See also 

 Education in Armenia

References

Educational institutions established in 2011
Education in Yerevan
2011 establishments in Armenia